Mike Cubbard is an Irish politician who served as Mayor of Galway from 2019 to 2021.

Political career 
Cubbard stood at the 2011 Irish general election in the Galway West constituency as an independent politician, receiving 853 first preference votes (1.4%) and being eliminated on the first count.

Cubbard was first elected to Galway City Council in 2014, topping the poll in the Galway City Central area. He was re-elected in 2019, once again topping the poll.

In 2016, Cubbard again ran for the Galway West constituency in the 2016 Irish general election. He received an increased share of 2,122 first preference votes (3.3%), but was eliminated on the 7th count.

He was first elected as Mayor of Galway in 2019 and re-elected in 2020, becoming the first mayor of Galway since 1967 to serve consecutive terms.

During his term as mayor in 2020, Cubbard ran in Galway West for a third time in the 2020 Irish general election. He again increased his vote share, receiving 2,676 votes (4.4%) but again was not elected. He has stated he will contest the next Irish general election.

In 2021, during his term as mayor, Cubbard was subjected to anonymous threats, and was forced out of his home. He took a two-week break from the mayorship in March 2021.

Personal life 
Outside of politics, Cubbard works in insurance. He is married to Karen, and the couple have three children.

References 

Mayors of Galway
Living people
Year of birth missing (living people)
Local councillors in Galway (city)
Politicians from County Galway